Ethan is a male given name of Hebrew origin that means "firm, enduring, strong and long-lived". The name Ethan appears eight times in the Hebrew Bible (1 Kings. 4:31, Ps. 89 title, 1 Chr. 2:6 and 2:8, 1 Chr. 6:42 and 6:44, and 1 Chr. 15:17 and 15:19). See Ethan (biblical figure).

It may also be spelled or pronounced as Etan, Eitan or Eytan.

Popularity
In 2013, it was the fourth most popular name for boys in Australia. Ethan is also popular in the United States and was the 10th most popular boy's name in 2016. According to the US data, 97% of all American boys named Ethan were born after 1989.

Notable people with the given name "Ethan" include

A
Ethan Alagich (born 2003), Australian footballer
Ethan Albright (born 1971), American football player
Ethan Allen (disambiguation), multiple people
Ethan Ampadu (born 2000), British footballer
Ethan Allen Andrews (disambiguation), multiple people
Ethan Anthony (born 1950), American architect
Ethan Ash, English singer-songwriter
Eytan Avriel (born 1960), Israeli journalist

B
Ethan Bamber (born 1998), English cricketer
Ethan Bartlow (born 2000), American soccer player
Ethan Bear (born 1997), Canadian ice hockey player
Ethen Beavers, American comic book artist
Ethan Becker, American knife maker
Ethan F. Becker, American speech coach
Ethan Beckford (born 1999), English footballer
Eytan Ben-David (born 1963), Israeli security expert
Ethan Berkowitz (born 1962), American politician
Ethan T. Berlin, American comedian and musician
Ethan Blackaby (1940–2022), American baseball player
Ethan Blackadder (born 1995), New Zealand rugby union footballer
Ethan Bortnick (born 2000), American pianist
Ethan Brierley (born 2003), English footballer
Ethan Bristow (born 2001), English footballer
Ethan Britto (born 2000), Gibraltarian footballer
Ethan Bronner (born 1954), American editor
Ethan Brookes (born 2001), English cricketer
Ethan Brooks (born 1972), American football player
Ethan Brooks (soccer) (born 2001), South African footballer
Ethan Brosh, Israeli-American guitarist
Ethan Brown (disambiguation), multiple people
Ethan Bryant (born 2001), American soccer player
Ethan Buckler (born 1967), American singer-songwriter
Ethan Bullemor (born 2000), Australian rugby union footballer
Ethan Butera (born 2006), Belgian footballer

C
Ethan Cairns (born 2004), Scottish footballer
Ethan Calleja (born 1999), Australian synchronized swimmer
Ethan Canin (born 1960), American author and physician
Ethan Carter (disambiguation), multiple people
Ethan Casey (born 1965), American journalist
Ethan Cepuran (born 2000), American speed skater
Ethan Chislett (born 1998), South African footballer
Ethan Chorin (born 1968), American scholar
Ethan Cochran (born 1994), American discus thrower
Ethan Coen (born 1957), American director and screenwriter
Ethan Cohen (disambiguation), multiple people
Ethan Cohn (born 1979), American actor
Ethan Coleman (born 2000), English footballer
Ethan Cook, American artist
Ethan Cooper (born 1995), American football player
Ethan Cormont (born 2000), French pole vaulter
Ethan Corson, American politician
Ethan Couch (born 1997), American convicted murderer
Ethan Coughlan (born 2002), Irish rugby union footballer
Ethan Cox (born 1987), Canadian ice hockey player
Ethan Cutkosky (born 1999), American actor

D
Ethan Daniel Davidson (born 1969), American musician
Ethan de Groot (born 1998), New Zealand rugby player
Ethan Dizon (born 2002), American actor
Ethan Dobbelaere (born 2002), American soccer player
Ethan Dolan (born 1999), American comedian
Ethan Drogin (born 1976), American television producer
Ethan Dube (born 1970), Zimbabwean cricketer
Ethan Dumortier (born 2000), French rugby union footballer
Ethan du Preez (born 2003), South African swimmer

E
Ethan Ebanks-Landell (born 1992), English professional footballer
Eytan Elbaz, American entrepreneur
Ethan Embry (born 1978), American  actor
Ethan Ennis (born 2004), English footballer
Ethan Erhahon (born 2001), Scottish footballer
Ethan Erickson (born 1973), American actor

F
Ethan Farmer, American bassist
Ethan Fernea (born 1998), American football player
Ethan Finlay (born 1990), American soccer player
Ethan Fisher (born 2001), South African rugby union footballer
Ethan Fixell (born 1982), American writer
Eytan Fox (born 1964), Israeli film director

G
Ethan Gage (born 1991), Canadian soccer player
Ethan Galbraith (born 2001), Northern Irish footballer
Ethan Gilsdorf (born 1966), American writer
Ethan A. Goldrich (born 1966), American diplomat
Ethan James Green (born 1990), American photographer
Ethan Greenidge (born 1997), American football player
Ethan Allen Greenwood (1779–1856), American lawyer
Ethan Gross, American television writer
Ethan Gutmann (born 1958), American writer

H
Ethan Hamilton (born 1998), Scottish footballer
Ethan Hammerton (born 2000), British racing driver
Ethan Hankins (born 2000), American baseball player
Ethan Hanns (born 1988), Samoan footballer
Ethan Happ (born 1996), American basketball player
Ethan Hardin (born 2003), American soccer player
Ethan Harris (disambiguation), multiple people
Ethan Havard (born 2000), Bulgarian rugby league footballer
Ethan Hawke (born 1970), American actor
Ethan Hayter (born 1998), English racing cyclist
Ethan H. D., American professional wrestler
Ethan Hemer (born 1991), American football player
Ethan Higbee, American filmmaker
Ethan Hill (born 2002), English footballer
Ethan Hitchcock (disambiguation), multiple people
Ethan Horton (born 1962), American football player
Ethan Horvath (born 1995), American soccer player
Ethan Hughes (born 1994), Australian rules footballer

I
Ethan Ingram (born 2003), English footballer
Ethan Iverson (born 1973), American pianist and composer

J
Ethan James (disambiguation), multiple people
Ethan Johns (born 1969), English record producer
Ethan Johnston (born 2002), English footballer
Ethan Jones (footballer) (born 1998), English footballer
Ethan Jolley (born 1997), Gibraltarian footballer
Ethan Juan (born 1982), Taiwanese actor

K
Ethan Kachosa (born 2003), English footballer
Ethan Kaplan, American economics professor
Ethan Kath (born 1977), Canadian songwriter and producer
Ethan Katz (born 1983), American baseball coach
Ethan B. Katz (born 1979), American writer
Ethan Katzberg, Canadian hammer thrower
Ethan Kelley (born 1980), American football player
Ethan Kenning (born 1943), American singer-songwriter
Ethan Kilmer (born 1983), American football player
Ethan Kleinberg, American professor
Ethan Kross, American psychologist
Ethan Kutler (born 1995), American soccer player

L
Ethan Laidlaw (1899–1963), American film actor
Ethan Laird (born 2001), English footballer
Ethan Lawrence (born 1992), English actor
Ethan Josh Lee, Korean-American actor
Ethan Leib (born 1975), American law professor
Ethan Lewis (born 1994), Welsh rugby union player
Ethan G. Lewis, American economics professor
Ethan Lindenberger (born 2001), American vaccine activist
Ethan Lloyd (born 2001), Welsh rugby union footballer
Ethan Lowe (born 1991), Australian rugby union player
Ethan Luck (born 1978), American musician and producer

M
Ethan Maniquis, American film editor
Ethan Manning, American politician
Ethan Martin (born 1989), American baseball player
Ethan Mbappé (born 2006), French footballer
Ethan McIlroy (born 2000), Irish rugby union footballer
Ethan McSweeny, American theatre director
Ethan B. Minier (1874–1958), American politician
Ethan Minsker (born 1969), American writer
Eytan Mirsky (born 1961), American singer-songwriter
Ethan Mitchell (born 1991), New Zealand track cyclist
Eytan Modiano, American professor
Ethan Mordden (born 1947), American author and researcher
Ethan Moreau (born 1975), Canadian ice hockey player

N
Ethan Nadelmann (born 1957), American activist
Ethan Natoli, Italian-Australian rugby league footballer
Ethan Nelson-Roberts (born 2000), English footballer
Ethan Nichtern (born 1978), American Buddhist teacher
Ethan Nicolle, American comic book creator
Ethan Nordean, American political activist
Ethan Nwaneri (born 2007), English footballer

O
Ethan O'Connor (born 1991), American lacrosse player
Ethan O'Donnell (born 1997), Irish Gaelic footballer
Ethan Ogrodniczuk (born 2001), Canadian cyclist
Ethan O'Reilly (born 1985), South African cricketer
Ethan Orr, American politician

P
Ethan Page (born 1989), Canadian professional wrestler
Ethan Panizza, Australian television actor
Ethan Paquin, American poet
Ethan Parry (born 1999), Australian rugby union footballer
Ethan Payne (born 1995), English YouTuber, (known online as Behzinga), part of The Sidemen
Ethan Peck (born 1986), American actor
Ethan Persoff (born 1974), American cartoonist
Eytan Pessen (born 1961), Israeli pianist
Ethan Peters (2003–2020), American beauty blogger
Ethan Phillips (born 1955), American actor
Ethan Pinnock (born 1992), English footballer
Ethan Place, American soldier
Ethan Pocic (born 1995), American football player
Ethan Pringle (born 1986), American rock climber
Ethan Prow (born 1992), American ice hockey player

Q
Ethan Quinn (born 2004), American tennis player

R
Ethan Rains (born 1981), Iranian-American actor
Ethan Randall (born 1978), American actor
Ethan Ringel (born 1994), American racing driver
Ethan Roberts (born 1997), American baseball player
Ethen Roberts (born 1990), American biker
Ethan Robson (born 1996), English footballer
Eytan Rockaway, American film director
Ethan Roots (born 1997), New Zealand rugby union player
Ethan Ross (disambiguation), multiple people
Ethan Rubinstein (1941–2015), Israeli-Canadian doctor
Ethan Ruby, American businessman
Ethan Rusbatch (born 1992), New Zealand basketball player
Ethan Russell (born 1945), American photographer
Ethan Ryan (born 1996), Irish rugby union player

S
Ethen Sampson (born 1993), South African footballer
Ethan Sandler (born 1972), American actor and film producer
Ethan Santos (born 1998), Gibraltarian footballer
Eytan Schwartz, Israeli-American public relations expert
Ethan H. Shagan (born 1971), American historian
Ethan A. H. Shepley (1896–1975), American academic administrator
Ethan M. Shevach (born 1943), American immunologist
Ethan Siegel (born 1978), American theoretical astrophysicist
Ethan Slater (born 1992), American actor
Ethan Small (born 1997), American baseball player
Ethan Smith (disambiguation), multiple people
Ethan Spaulding, American animator and director
Eytan Stibbe (born 1958), Israeli pilot
Ethan Stiefel (born 1973), American ballet dancer
Ethan Stoller, American composer
Ethan Strimling (born 1967), American corporate executive
Ethan Stroud (1788–1846), American trader
Ethan Suplee (born 1976), American actor

T
Ethan Thompson (born 1999), Puerto Rican basketball player
Ethan Tobman (born 1979), Canadian film production designer
Ethan Tracy (born 1989), American professional golfer
Ethan Tucker, American rabbi
Ethan Tufts (born 1976), American songwriter
Ethan Twomey (born 2002), Irish hurler

V
Ethan Vanacore-Decker (born 1994), American soccer player
Ethan Van der Ryn (born 1962), American sound editor
Ethan van Leeuwen (born 2001), English badminton player
Ethan Van Sciver (born 1974), American comic book artist
Ethan Vernon (born 2000), British cyclist
Ethan Vishniac (born 1955), American astrophysicist
Ethan Vogt (born 1974), American filmmaker

W
Ethan Waddleton (born 1996), English rugby union footballer
Ethan Walker (born 2002), English footballer
Ethan Waller (born 1992), English rugby union player
Ethan Warren (born 1991), Australian diver
Ethan Watters (born 1964), American journalist
Ethan Watts (born 1972), American volleyball player
Ethan Wayne (born 1962), American actor
Ethan Werek (born 1991), Canadian ice hockey player
Ethan Westbrooks (born 1990), American football player
Ethan White (born 1991), American soccer player
Ethan Wiley, American record producer
Ethan Willie (born 1999), Bahamian footballer
Ethan Wilson (born 1999), American baseball player
Ethan Wolf (born 1995), American football player
Ethan Wragge (born 1990), American basketball player

Y
Ethan Young (born 2004), English footballer

Z
Ethan Zohn (born 1973), American motivational speaker, former professional soccer player, and reality TV personality
Ethan Zubak (born 1998), American soccer player
Ethan Zuckerman (born 1973), American businessman

Notable fictional characters
Ethan Edwards, a character in the comic book series Marvel Comics
Ethan Hardy, a character on the drama series Casualty
Ethan Hunt, a character in the film series Mission: Impossible
Ethan Lovett, a character on the soap opera General Hospital
Ethan Rom, a character on the television series Lost
Ethan Winters, a character in the video game series Resident Evil
Ethan Winthrop, a character on the drama series Passions
Ethan Zobelle, a character on the television series Sons of Anarchy

Surname
Michael Eitan (born 1944), Israeli politician
Rafael Eitan (1929–2004), Israeli general and politician 
Rafi Eitan (born 1926), Israeli politician
Freddy Eytan (born 1947), Israeli diplomat and writer
Walter Eytan (1910-2001), Israeli diplomat

See also
Eitan (disambiguation), a disambiguation page for "Eitan"
Etan (disambiguation), a disambiguation page for "Etan"
Ethan (disambiguation), a disambiguation page for "Ethan"
Ethen (disambiguation), a disambiguation page for "Ethen"

References 

Jewish given names
Given names of Hebrew language origin
Hebrew masculine given names
English masculine given names
Modern names of Hebrew origin